The Necronauts is a band originally from Mesa, Arizona. It has been active for well over ten years and maintains a place in the Arizona punk rock scene, and has now started to find a place nationwide.

History
The Necronauts formed in 2000 in Dale and Billy Goodman's parents' trailer in East Mesa, Arizona, with Dale on drums and Billy on vocals and guitars. Together, they would produce a genre bending style of music that is all their own, but can mostly fit into simply punk rock. Over the years, they have enlisted the help of many different bass players, but currently on bass is Young Joe Edwards.

The band's name comes from a comic book character created by Billy G. According to Billy, the meaning of "necronaut" is quite simple: necro, meaning dead, and naut, meaning sailor or explorer.  In interviews, he has also said that it could be taken to mean "a fear of reflected light, like a reflected soul, a fear of dying."

Like many other bands, they started very small, releasing multiple CD-Rs recorded in Billy G.'s garage. In addition, their first studio recording, called Melodic Array of Change, would be recorded by a group of students at the Conservatory of Recording Arts and Sciences in Tempe, Arizona and released by tiny indie labels High School Football Records (owned and managed by Billy G.) and Sunset Alliance (which was then just getting started). In spite of its small release, this record would start to draw positive critical press for the band. Admiring the band's ability to move from genre to genre during the length of one album, the critic at Impact Press would call it "some good stuff from the Grand Canyon State."

By 2005, when the Necronauts released their acclaimed self-titled EP, the Arizona Republic would select them as its Best Indie Rock Band.<ref>[http://thenecronauts.com/press.htm "Best Indie Rock Band: The Necronauts, The Arizona Republic, 2005] retrieved 03-17-12</ref> The Necronauts would continue to ride their local success for a while, but this was the last album the Necronauts would release for six years, as Billy G. worked to expand his record label, High School Football Records, to a roster that includes eight artists that freely disseminate their music on-line.

The Necronauts' 2011 release is perhaps their most-ambitious, and definitely their most critically acclaimed album to date. Gauche et Droite'', a two-disc, forty track record on High School Football Records and Black Cactus Records, draws comparisons to the likes of "Built to Spill, Dinosaur Jr., Pavement, Sonic Youth, the Pixies and Fugazi,". This album would receive four stars from Jeffrey Sisk at The Daily News in Pennsylvania. In addition, Mike at Brooklyn Rocks called this album "essential listening."

Band members

Current members
 Billy Goodman (Billy G.) - Vocals, Bass (2000–present)
 Dale Goodman - Drums (2000–present)
 Tim Culver - (TopKey) Keyboards (2014–present)
 Matthew Reveles - Guitar, Vocals (2016–present)

Former members
 Andrew Pangus - Bass (2000 - 2008)
 Christopher Warmuth - Bass (2008 - 2010)
 Jason Sukut - Bass (2010 - 2011)
 Joe Edwards - Bass (2011–2012)

Discography

Albums

References

External links
 The Necronauts official website
 The Necronauts Bandcamp
 High School Football Records
 Sunset Alliance Records

Musicians from Mesa, Arizona
Indie rock musical groups from Arizona
Punk rock groups from Arizona